Pedro García Barros (born 3 April 1946) is a football manager and former Chilean football midfielder, who made his debut for the Chile national football team on 1967-09-19.

Manager honours

Club
Colo-Colo
 Primera División de Chile (2): 1981, 1983
 Copa Chile (3): 1981, 1982, 1985

References

External links
 Profile

1946 births
Living people
Footballers from Santiago
Chilean footballers
Chilean expatriate footballers
Chile international footballers
Deportes Temuco footballers
Unión Española footballers
Colo-Colo footballers
O'Higgins F.C. footballers
Club Universidad Nacional footballers
Deportes La Serena footballers
Chilean Primera División players
Liga MX players
Association football midfielders
Chilean football managers
Chilean expatriate football managers
Chile national under-20 football team managers
Unión Española managers
San Marcos de Arica managers
Deportes Concepción (Chile) managers
Colo-Colo managers
Filanbanco managers
Club León managers
Club Puebla managers
C.F. Monterrey managers
Atlas F.C. managers
Deportes La Serena managers
Santos Laguna managers
Santiago Wanderers managers
Chile national football team managers
Huachipato managers
2001 Copa América managers
Chilean Primera División managers
Liga MX managers
Chilean expatriate sportspeople in Mexico
Chilean expatriate sportspeople in Ecuador
Expatriate footballers in Mexico
Expatriate football managers in Ecuador
Expatriate football managers in Mexico